= 7th GMA Dove Awards =

1975 US music awards ceremony

- Date: 1975
- Location: Nashville, Tennessee

The 7th Annual GMA Dove Awards were held on 1975 recognizing accomplishments of musicians for the year 1974. The show was held in Nashville, Tennessee.
